OCR Nationals are vocationally related qualifications which were officially launched by the OCR Board in September 2004.  The qualifications are designed to meet the needs of those seeking vocational education in place of the traditional, theory-intensive, academic route. Although the target audience are teenagers (14-19), the qualifications are also suitable for adult learners, much like the GNVQ.  The OCR Nationals are being phased out, and replaced by the Cambridge Nationals.

New alternative
OCR Nationals are available at Levels 1, 2 and 3.

They are available in the following subject areas:
 Business
 Design
 Health & Social care
 Information Technology
 Leisure/Travel & Tourism
 Media
 Public Services
 Science
 Sport

ICT

OCR National ICT Level 2
The OCR Level 2 Nationals in ICT have been developed to recognise learners' skills, knowledge and understanding of Information and Communication Technology functions, environments and operations.

The learners carry out a range of tasks that have been designed to recognise their achievements in a modern, practical way that is relevant to the workplace.

They do not certificate competence on the job but are work-related qualifications which will support progression to an NVQ once a candidate is in the workplace.
Specification aims

These qualifications specifically aim to:
Develop learner's knowledge and understanding of the Information and Communication Technology sector
Develop learner's skills, knowledge and understanding in contexts that are directly relevant to employment situations, thereby enhancing their employability within the Information and Communication Technology sector
Develop learner's ability to work autonomously and effectively in an Information and Communication Technology context
Enable learners to develop knowledge and understanding in specialist areas of Information and Communication Technology, and demonstrate the skills needed to participate in the operation and development of ICT specific or ICT non-specific business organisations
Encourage progression by assisting in the development of skills, knowledge and understanding that learners will need to access further or higher education programmes or occupational training on a full-time or part-time basis
Encourage progression by assisting in the development of skills, knowledge and understanding that learners will need to enter employment or enhance their current employment status
Promote interaction between employers, centres and learners by relating teaching and assessment to real organisations.

All units are centre-assessed and externally moderated by OCR. There are no timetabled exams for this qualification; candidates may complete units at a time that suits the centre. The full award and units from this qualification are graded as Pass, Merit or Distinction.

The units are split into three sections A,B and C.

A=1
B=2-18
C=19-23

There are other ways to do it for example 2 fewer units from the C and one extra from B.

List of Unit Titles

Mandatory
Unit 1 ICT skills for business

Optional
Unit 2 Webpage creation
Unit 3 Digital imaging - plan and produce computer graphics
Unit 4 Design and produce multimedia products
Unit 5 Desktop publishing
Unit 6 Spreadsheets - design and use
Unit 7 Databases - design and use
Unit 8 Technological innovation and e-commerce
Unit 9 Customer support
Unit 10 Planning and supporting telecommunications
Unit 11 Career planning for IT
Unit 12 Work experience in IT
Unit 13 IT systems and user needs
Unit 14 Installation of applications
Unit 15 System testing and maintenance
Unit 16 Repair and decommission of IT equipment
Unit 17 CAD and CAM
Unit 18 Application of computer control
Unit 19 Application of data logging
Unit 20 Creating animation for the WWW using ICT
Unit 21 Creating computer graphics
Unit 22 Creating sound using ICT
Unit 23 Creating video

Source: OCR

Qualifications

See also
BTEC

References

OCR (2011) Qualification structure. Last accessed 31 March 2011.

External links

OCR Board official website

Educational qualifications in the United Kingdom